"Why Can't I Have You" is a song by American rock band the Cars from their fifth studio album, Heartbeat City (1984). It was released on January 7, 1985, as the album's fifth single. Written by Ric Ocasek, the song is a lush ballad.

Release
Cash Box reviewed the single, saying that "this moody piece of peculiarly American synth-pop is pure Ric Ocasek: broken romance lyrics, angular musical backing and a handful of melodic hooks."

Although it did not reach the top 20 like its four predecessors, "Why Can't I Have You" managed to reach number 33 on the Billboard Hot 100, as well as number 11 on the Top Rock Tracks chart. The song was the final single from Heartbeat City released in the United States; in the United Kingdom, however, a sixth single, "Heartbeat City", was released after "Why Can't I Have You".

B-side
The B-side of "Why Can't I Have You" was the non-album track "Breakaway", described as having "Euro-disco undertones" in the liner notes of Just What I Needed: The Cars Anthology (1995).

Charts

References

1980s ballads
1984 songs
1985 singles
The Cars songs
Elektra Records singles
New wave ballads
Song recordings produced by Ric Ocasek
Song recordings produced by Robert John "Mutt" Lange
Songs written by Ric Ocasek